Krushelnitskiy, Krushelnitski or Krushelnitsky (/ˌkrʊʃəlˈnɪtski/ KRUUSH-əl-NIT-skee; Russian: Крушельницкий) is a Polish and Russian masculine surname, its feminine counterpart is Krushelnitskaya, Krushelnitskaia. The Polish variant of this surname is Kruszelnicki (masculine) or Kruszelnicka (feminine). It may refer to:

Alexander Krushelnitskiy (born 1992), Russian curler
Karl Kruszelnicki, Australian science communicator and populariser
Tadeusz Kruszelnicki (born 1955), Polish wheelchair tennis player
Yaroslav Krushelnitskiy (born 1983), Uzbekistani football defender

See also
Krushelnytskyi

References

Polish-language surnames
Russian-language surnames